In Euclidean geometry, a harmonic quadrilateral, or harmonic quadrangle, is a quadrilateral that can be inscribed in a circle (cyclic quadrangle) in which the products of the lengths of opposite sides are equal. It has several important properties.

Properties 
Let  be a harmonic quadrilateral and  the midpoint of diagonal . Then:

 The point of intersection of the diagonals is located towards the sides of the quadrilateral to proportional distances to the length of these sides.

References

Further reading 
 Gallatly, W. "The Harmonic Quadrilateral." §124 in The Modern Geometry of the Triangle, 2nd ed. London: Hodgson, pp. 90 and 92, 1913.

Types of quadrilaterals